Galena High School may refer to one of several high schools in the United States: 

Galena Junior/Senior High School — Galena, Alaska - Galena City School District
Galena High School (Illinois) — Galena, Illinois
Galena High School (Kansas) — Galena, Kansas
Galena High School (Missouri) — Galena, Missouri
Galena High School (Nevada) — Reno, Nevada
Galena Park High School — Galena Park, Texas